Duckbill was a sandstone hoodoo rock formation at Cape Kiwanda State Natural Area, in the U.S. state of Oregon. The formation served as a tourist attraction along the Oregon Coast and was photographed frequently prior to being toppled by a group of teenage vandals on August 29, 2016.

The group of vandals who toppled the popular landmark asserted that they did so to eliminate what they called "a safety hazard" because a friend of theirs had broken a leg on the rock formation, apparently thinking that they thus did "a public service". Chris Havel, Oregon Parks and Recreation Department associate director, however, noted that the formation was fenced-off and signs warned visitors against approaching it: "The fence is very clear; you have to intentionally move the wires aside and crawl through it." The vandals have not yet been caught, however.

References

External link

2016 disestablishments in Oregon
Defunct tourist attractions in the United States
Destroyed rock formations
Erosion landforms
Oregon Coast
Rock formations of Oregon
Sandstone formations of the United States
Tillamook County, Oregon
Tourist attractions in Oregon
Vandalism